"Just Dance" is the debut single by American singer Lady Gaga. She co-wrote the song with Akon and his producer RedOne. It also features vocals from Colby O'Donis and was released on April 8, 2008, as the lead single from Gaga's debut studio album, The Fame. The song was written by Gaga in 10 minutes as "a happy record". "Just Dance" lyrically speaks about being intoxicated at a club.

"Just Dance" received acclaim from music critics, who complimented its club anthem-like nature and the sound associated with it. The song was a sleeper hit, spending almost five months on the Billboard Hot 100 before finally peaking at the chart's summit in January 2009. Outside of the United States, "Just Dance" topped the charts Australia, Canada, Greece, Ireland, the Netherlands, and the United Kingdom, as well as the top ten of the charts in the Czech Republic, Denmark, Germany, Hungary, Israel, New Zealand, Norway, Spain, and Sweden. The single is among the best-selling singles of all time, having sold over 10 million copies.

The music video of the song portrayed Lady Gaga appearing in a party where she plays the song, prompting party-goers to start dancing in enjoyment. Gaga compared her experience of shooting the video with being on a Martin Scorsese movie set. "Just Dance" was performed by Gaga in a number of live appearances,  such as Jimmy Kimmel Live! and The Tonight Show with Jay Leno, all of her concert tours, and the Super Bowl LI halftime show. She usually plays on a keytar while performing the song. In 2009, the song received a Grammy nomination in the Best Dance Recording category but lost to electronic duo Daft Punk for their song "Harder, Better, Faster, Stronger (Alive 2007)".

Writing and inspiration 

"Just Dance" was written by Gaga and Akon with co-writing by RedOne, who also produced the track. In an interview with Heat, Gaga explained her inspiration for writing the song. She said, "I was very hung-over. I wrote the song in about 10 minutes with [producer] RedOne. And it was my first time being in a Hollywood studio. Very pristine, big huge room with giant speakers." Gaga wrote "Just Dance" during 2008 and according to her it was "hard work and a lot of people didn't believe in it at first". Later, Gaga reflected on the song by saying,
"That record saved my life. I was in such a dark space in New York. I was so depressed, always in a bar. I got on a plane to LA to do my music and was given one shot to write the song that would change my life and I did. I never went back. I left behind my boyfriend, my apartment. I still haven't been back. My mother went in and cleared it for me."
In an interview with Contactmusic.com, Gaga explained that "Just Dance" is a happy record and is supposed to be appreciated by people going through rough times like losing jobs and homes etc. Gaga further explained with Artistdirect that she wanted to write a beautiful record with "Just Dance". Being asked the reason for which "Just Dance" has become popular, Gaga said that she thought, "Everyone is looking for a song that really speaks to the joy in our souls and in our hearts and having a good time. It's just one of those records. It feels really good, and when you listen to it, it makes you feel good inside. It's as simple as that. I don't think it's rocket science when it comes to the heart. I think it's a heart theme song." In March 2010, the song was released as downloadable content for the music-based videogame series Rock Band, alongside "Poker Face", "Monster" and "Bad Romance" as part of "Lady Gaga Pack 01".

Akon said in 2018 that he was originally the featured artist on the song, and the version with him was the one originally sent to radio stations. However, his record label Interscope blocked him from being featured on the record, leading to the single being quickly recalled and replaced with a new version featuring Akon's protégé O'Donis singing his verse instead. Akon's backing vocals were retained on this final version. In March 2017, Kimberly Wyatt from the Pussycat Dolls said that "Just Dance" was originally written as a demo for the group. Their team passed on the song and Gaga decided to perform the song herself.

Composition 

"Just Dance" is an uptempo electropop, synth-pop and dance-pop song, combining synths of clipped marching beats with soaring electronics. It is written in the key of C minor and is set at a moderate dance tempo of 119 beats per minute. Gaga's vocal spans from the low note of G3 to the high note of C5. The song begins with a fast tempo following by the synth arrangement and Gaga uttering "RedOne". "Just Dance" has a basic progression of Cm–E–B–Fm. O'Donis sings the interlude in the same range as Gaga followed by an R&B-influenced interlude by her, after which the chorus is repeated with O'Donis providing backup vocals and the marching beats. The song ends with an echoing of the word "dance".

Lyrically, "Just Dance" throws a partial tongue-in-cheek perspective with lyrics like "What's going on on the floor? / I love this record, baby but I can't see straight anymore". The lyrics deal with being completely intoxicated at a party. The opening lyric "RedOne" has often been misinterpreted as "red wine" but in actuality is a reference to music producer RedOne.

Critical reception 
Matthew Chisling of AllMusic described the song as "a powerhouse of dance waves and infectiously produced beats". Alexis Petridis of The Guardian called it a "beguilingly compulsive tale of pulling a drug-induced whitey, with a combination of clipped marching beats, sawing electronics and mild R&B flavor that bears a vague resemblance to Nelly Furtado's 'Maneater'". Ben Norman of About.com said that the song "opens the album like a valkyrie leading the charge [...] riding triumphant ahead of her army. If you don't know this song, use your browser. I won't waste time explaining what it sounds like." However he also noted that the song is not groundbreaking and compared it to the music of Rihanna, Chris Brown and The Pussycat Dolls. Bill Lamb from About.com called the song tame but catchy enough for Gaga to be noticed in mainstream. He also added that "'Just Dance' has strong energy and features Lady Gaga's striking voice, but it ultimately adds up to rather bland dance-pop." O'Donis' smooth vocals were also complimented.

Evan Sawdey of PopMatters said that "Just Dance" is an intensely catchy single and is an excellent indicator of what the album was all about. Ben Hogwood of MusicOMH praised the song saying, "You won't get many more catchy party odes than the chart topping Just Dance this year, a polished gem set to lodge in your head for the next few weeks." Freedom lu Lac of The Washington Post described the song to be "filled with mindlessly frothy synth-pop that matches low-grade dance grooves with GaGa's icy, almost disembodied vocals about dancing bliss". Lynn Saxberg from the Ottawa Citizen, while reviewing Gaga's The Fame Ball Tour, called the song a perfect sing-along club anthem. Sal Cinquemani from Slant Magazine wrote that the song resembles the "desperate train wreck you're likely to encounter getting wasted at any dive on the L.E.S. at four in the morning" as is emphasized by the lyrics. Talia Kranes from BBC called the song irresistible and said that "the catchiness of her songs is sure to cement her place in the list of pop idols".

Chart performance 

In the United States, "Just Dance" was initially a club hit following its release, peaking at number two on both the Hot Dance Airplay and Hot Dance Club Play charts during the summer of 2008. The song entered the Billboard Hot 100 chart at number 76 on August 16, 2008. After five months, it gradually rose to number two on the Hot 100, after selling 419,000 in downloads on January 10, 2009. The next week, the song reached number one on the Hot 100. The single took a total of 22 weeks to hit the top spot, which is the longest climb to number one since Creed's "With Arms Wide Open" took 27 weeks before finally reaching number one in November 2000. The song also reached the top of the Mainstream Top 40 chart, becoming Gaga's first number-one song. "Just Dance" spent a total of 49 weeks on the Hot 100 and on March 27, 2020, the single was certified nine times platinum by the Recording Industry Association of America (RIAA) for shipment of nine million copies. It was the second song to reach the six-million mark in paid downloads, following "I Gotta Feeling" by The Black Eyed Peas. As of February 2018, "Just Dance" has sold 7.2 million digital downloads in the United States. In Canada, the song debuted at number 97 on the Canadian Hot 100 for the issue dated June 7, 2008. It reached the top of the chart on August 23, 2008, and was present there for five consecutive weeks. The song was certified six times platinum by the Canadian Recording Industry Association (CRIA) in June 2009, for sales of 240,000 copies in paid digital downloads.

The track debuted at number 34 on the ARIA Singles Chart on July 21, 2008, and moved up to number 17 the next week. On September 15, 2008, the track reached the top of the chart. "Just Dance" was certified three times platinum by the Australian Recording Industry Association (ARIA) for shipment of 210,000 copies. The song was credited as the longest charting single in ARIA history, spending over 81 weeks in the top 100. "Just Dance" debuted on the New Zealand charts at number 19, and reached a peak of number three. It has been certified platinum by the Recording Industry Association of New Zealand (RIANZ) for shipment of 15,000 copies of the single.

In the United Kingdom, "Just Dance" debuted at number three on the UK Singles Chart, on January 4, 2009. It rose to number one the next week with total sales of 65,764 copies, and remained at the top for three weeks. Gaga explained her feelings on reaching number-one in the United Kingdom saying, "It's been a long running dream to have a big hit in the UK – my fans there are so sexy and the people are so innovative and free in how they think about pop culture and music. I was in my apartment in Los Angeles getting ready to go to dance rehearsal when they called and told me, and I just cried." According to the British Phonographic Industry (BPI) the song was certified platinum and in July 2016 it became Gaga's third song to pass one million combined sales in the United Kingdom based on streaming. By January 2017, it had been streamed 6.3 million times in the nation according to the Official Charts Company, and by May 2020 the song had sold 968,000 copies. The song was declared Gaga's fourth most popular track in the UK by July 2022 having amassed a total of 1.6 millions chart units sold, with 72 million streams.

In Ireland, the song debuted at number eleven, and after one week it peaked atop the chart. The song also peaked the Dutch Top 40 on February 28, 2009. Across Europe, "Just Dance" reached the top ten in Austria, Denmark, Finland, Germany, Norway, Sweden, Switzerland and the top twenty of Belgium (Flanders and Wallonia) and France. Worldwide the song has sold over 10 million digital copies.

Music video 

Released on April 25, 2008, the video was directed by music video director Melina Matsoukas, and is based on the thematic content of the song of being in a party. The video begins with Gaga arriving with her background dancers at a house party, which seems to have ended. One of the dancers puts a Discolite boombox on, blaring the music through the house. The crowd at the party appear to be sleeping in different areas, and are awoken by the music. They all start to dance, and scenes of the party are intercut with scenes of a scantily clad Gaga dancing in a poncho, with a disco ball or in a small kiddie pool playing with an inflated orca whale. She wears a blue, lightning-bolt shaped sticker beneath her right eye like that on the single cover, which paid tribute to the album cover of David Bowie's Aladdin Sane, as he is one of her musical idols. O'Donis appears in the video being flanked by several girls during the "When I come through on the dance floor" interlude. Cameo appearances are made by Akon and Space Cowboy. MTV called the video an ode to the "Me Decade". During an interview with Australian radio in September 2008, Gaga said that "[t]he whole video is performance art about being drunk at a party." When asked about the shooting experience of the music video, Gaga explained,
"Oh it was so fun, it was amazing. For me it was like being on a Martin Scorsese set. I've been so low budget for so long, and to have this incredibly amazing video was really very humbling. It was really fun, but you'll see if you ever come to a video shoot of mine one day – I'm very private about those things, I don't really talk to everybody. I'm not like the party girl running around. I might even seem to be a bit of a diva. I'm sort of with myself, in my work head space worrying about costumes, and if extras look right, and placement. I don't just show up for things, you know. That video was a vision of mine. It was Melina the director who wanted to do something, to have a performance art aspect that was so pop but it was still commercial, but that felt like lifestyle. It was all those things, I love it."

The official video on Lady Gaga's Vevo channel, LadyGagaVevo, was a favorite among fans on and around December 8, 2009, the day Vevo was launched.

Live performances 

In July, she performed the song for the first time at the swimsuit competition of the Miss Universe 2008 in Vietnam, later Lady Gaga performed the song on many television shows in the United States. She appeared on Jimmy Kimmel Live!, The Tonight Show with Jay Leno, So You Think You Can Dance and The Ellen DeGeneres Show. In Australia, she performed on Sunrise, where her performance was condemned for lip-synching. Gaga denied it and released a statement saying "I was sick the day of the show but I absolutely, 100 per cent, was singing live. [...]  have never lip-synched and never will. Even on my worst day, I never will." In the United Kingdom, she performed the song on GMTV. She also performed the single during her AOL sessions.

"Just Dance" was added to the setlist of her first headlining The Fame Ball Tour, where it was performed before the Encore. As the performance for the acoustic version of "Poker Face" ended, Gaga exited from the stage and a video interlude called "The Face" starts telling about Gaga's alternate persona Candy Warhol and teaching her to speak. Gaga appeared on the stage wearing a tutu shaped dress with pointed shoulderpads and peplum. Her dancers were clad in Louis Vuitton Steven Sprouse printed trousers which matched Gaga's shoes. The backdrop changed to show blinking disco lights and Gaga stood wearing her video sunglasses, displaying the line "Pop Music Will Never Be Low Brow". A remix of the intro for "Just Dance" started and Gaga started singing the song, while moving around in choreographed dance moves.

The song was also added to the setlist of The Monster Ball Tour. During the original version of the tour, she performed it as the second song of the list. After opening song "Dance in the Dark", she strapped on a portable silver jewelled keyboard and started performing "Just Dance" while inside a white cube from which she emerged from the top, and the video screen came up. She was raised on a platform with a keytar over her shoulder as eight dancers in white bodysuits locked into steps below her. For the revamped Monster Ball shows, in 2010–11, Gaga wore a futuristic "glitter ball suit", and started the performance by playing on a keyboard hidden inside the hood of a Rolls-Royce. In May 2011, Gaga performed the song during Radio 1's Big Weekend in Carlisle, Cumbria.

"Just Dance" was included on her third concert tour, the  Born This Way Ball (2012–2013), where Gaga performed it on the extended stage walkway and shouted off to her fans for joining and dancing onstage. Emily Zemler from The Hollywood Reporter noted that "For all her preconceived speeches, these genuine moments resonated deeply with the audience, most of whom were dressed in tribute to the singer." In 2014, Gaga performed the song during her residency show at Roseland Ballroom, while wearing a yellow outfit. For her worldwide tour, ArtRave: The Artpop Ball, Gaga combined "Just Dance" with short performances of "Poker Face" and "Telephone". While she danced and sang the songs, the backdrops displayed multiple images of Gaga writhing around, while wrapped in tinsel and moss. During "Just Dance", she strapped on a seahorse-shaped keytar. Melissa Ruggieri from The Atlanta Journal-Constitution was impressed with Gaga's vocals and complimented her for performing "old songs" in her actual voice.

On February 5, 2017, Gaga performed "Just Dance" during the Super Bowl LI halftime show. She was wearing a spicy gold jacket and played on a keytar, while one of her dancers held the microphone for her. In the same year, the song was added to the setlist of Gaga's two shows at the Coachella Festival, where she was one of the headliners. On the Joanne World Tour (2017–2018), Gaga wore a pearl-encrusted pale blue bodysuit with dramatic shoulder pads, and knee-high lace up boots while performing the track. "Just Dance" served as the opening song of the singer's Las Vegas residency, Enigma (2018–2020). During the performance, Gaga descends from the ceiling in a harness and a sequined jumpsuit while playing on a keytar. In 2022, the singer performed "Just Dance" at The Chromatica Ball stadium tour.

In other media 
"Just Dance" was featured in a episode of the The Office by the name of Michael Scott Paper Company, in which Steve Carell's character mistakens it for a Britney Spears song.

"Just Dance" also appears on the 2010 video game Dance Central. The song was also planned to be on the main track list of the video game Just Dance 2, but was scrapped for unknown reasons. The song eventually made a final appearance in the series in Just Dance 2014.

Track listings and formats 

 U.S./Japanese CD single
 "Just Dance" – 4:02
 "Just Dance" (Harry 'Choo Choo' Romero's Bambossa Main Mix) – 7:12
 "Just Dance" (Richard Vission Remix) – 6:13
 "Just Dance" (Trevor Simpson Remix) – 7:20
 Australian/German CD single
 "Just Dance" – 4:02
 "Just Dance" (Trevor Simpson Remix) – 7:21
 German CD maxi single
 "Just Dance" – 4:02
 "Just Dance" (Harry 'Choo Choo' Romero's Bambossa Main Mix) – 7:14
 "Just Dance" (Instrumental Version) – 4:00
 "Just Dance" (Video) – 4:10
 French CD maxi single
 "Just Dance" – 4:02
 "Just Dance" (Glam As You Radio Mix By Guéna LG) – 3:39
 "Just Dance" (Glam As You Club Mix By Guéna LG) – 6:25

 US iTunes Remixes EP
 "Just Dance" – 4:02
 "Just Dance" (Harry 'Choo Choo' Romero's Bambossa Main Mix) – 7:12
 "Just Dance" (Richard Vission Remix) – 6:13
 "Just Dance" (Trevor Simpson Remix) – 7:20
 US iTunes Remixes Pt. 2 EP
 "Just Dance" (RedOne Remix) [feat. Kardinal Offishall] – 4:18
 "Just Dance" (Space Cowboy Remix) [feat. Colby O'Donis] – 5:01
 "Just Dance" (Robots To Mars Remix) – 4:37
 "Just Dance" (Tony Arzadon Remix) [feat. Colby O'Donis] – 6:24
 UK EP
 "Just Dance" – 4:02
 "Just Dance" (Remix) [featuring Kardinal Offishall] – 4:18
 "Just Dance" (Glam As You Mix By Guéna LG) – 6:25
 "Just Dance" (Music Video) – 4:06
 UK 7" numbered picture vinyl disc
 "Just Dance" (Main Version) – 4:04
 "Just Dance" (Harry 'Choo Choo' Romero's Bambossa Main Mix) – 7:12

Credits and personnel 
Credits adapted from the liner notes of The Fame.

 Lady Gaga –  lead vocals, songwriting, background vocals
 RedOne – songwriting, production, background vocals, instrumentation, music programming, recording at Record Plant Studios, Hollywood, Los Angeles, California
 Akon – songwriting, background vocals
 Colby O'Donis – additional lead vocals, background vocals
 Dave Russel – audio engineering
 Robert Orton – audio mixing
 Gene Grimaldi – audio mastering at Oasis Mastering, Burbank, California

Charts

Weekly charts

Year-end charts

Decade-end charts

All-time charts

Certifications and sales

Release history

See also 

 List of Canadian Hot 100 number-one singles of 2008
 List of number-one singles of 2008 (Australia)
 List of Billboard Hot 100 number ones of 2009
 List of UK Singles Chart number ones of the 2000s
 List of number-one singles of 2009 (Ireland)
 List of Dutch Top 40 number-one singles of 2009

References 

2008 debut singles
2008 songs
Billboard Hot 100 number-one singles
Canadian Hot 100 number-one singles
Cherrytree Records singles
Colby O'Donis songs
Dutch Top 40 number-one singles
Interscope Records singles
Irish Singles Chart number-one singles
Lady Gaga songs
Music videos directed by Melina Matsoukas
Number-one singles in Australia
Song recordings produced by RedOne
Songs about alcohol
Songs about nightclubs
Songs about parties
Songs written by Akon
Songs written by Lady Gaga
Songs written by RedOne
UK Singles Chart number-one singles